WWYZ (92.5 FM) is a commercial radio station licensed to Waterbury, Connecticut, and serving the Central Connecticut, Greater Hartford and Southern Connecticut areas.  It is owned by iHeartMedia, and airs a country radio format.

The studios and offices are located on Columbus Boulevard in Hartford.  The station's transmitter is in Meriden, on West Peak in the Hanging Hills.

History

WATR-FM
The station signed on the air on August 1, 1961, as WATR-FM.  It was owned by the Gilmore family, which also owned AM 1320 WATR and Channel 53 WATR-TV (now Channel 20 WCCT-TV).

The call sign stood for the city of license, Waterbury.  At first, WATR-FM simulcast the AM 1320 programming.  In the early 1970s, it switched to an easy listening format.  In 1973, it briefly changed to WENU-FM, before changing again to WWYZ. With the new call sign, the station referred to itself as "The Music Lover's WISE Choice". In the 1980s, WWYZ broadcast a mix of formats from country to Top-40. In between late August and early September 1988, it became an all country formatted station.

Switch to country
In July 1999, WWYZ was bought by AMFM, Inc.  The following year, AMFM was acquired by Clear Channel Communications, which changed its name in 2014 to iHeartMedia.

References

External links

Website
Listen Now

Waterbury, Connecticut
Mass media in New Haven County, Connecticut
Country radio stations in the United States
WYZ
IHeartMedia radio stations
Radio stations established in 1961
1961 establishments in Connecticut